Jessie Loftin Britt Jr. (born March 3, 1963) is a former American football wide receiver who played one season with the Pittsburgh Steelers of the National Football League. He played college football at North Carolina A&T State University and attended Gates County Senior High School in Gatesville, North Carolina.

References

External links
Just Sports Stats
Fanbase profile

Living people
1963 births
Players of American football from Virginia
American football wide receivers
African-American players of American football
North Carolina A&T Aggies football players
Pittsburgh Steelers players
Sportspeople from Suffolk, Virginia
People from Gatesville, North Carolina
21st-century African-American people
20th-century African-American sportspeople